Genomoviridae is a family of single stranded DNA viruses that mainly infect fungi. The genomes of this family are small (2.2–2.4 kilobases in length). The genomes are circular single-stranded DNA and encode rolling-circle replication initiation proteins (Rep) and unique capsid proteins. In Rep-based phylogenies, genomoviruses form a sister clade to plant viruses of the family Geminiviridae. Ten genera are recognized in this family.

The family name is an acronym derived from geminivirus-like, no movement protein.

The genus name Gemycircularvirus stands for Gemini-like myco-infecting circular virus. The type species of the genus Gemycircularvirus — Sclerotinia gemycircularvirus 1, reference strain Sclerotinia sclerotiorum hypovirulence associated DNA virus 1 (ssHADV-1), — was the first cultivated member of the family. The other genomoviruses are uncultivated and have been discovered using metagenomics techniques.


Taxonomy
The genera in this family are:
 Gemycircularvirus
 Gemyduguivirus
 Gemygorvirus
 Gemykibivirus
 Gemykolovirus
 Gemykrogvirus
 Gemykroznavirus
 Gemytondvirus
 Gemytripvirus
 Gemyvongvirus

Virology

These viruses have circular single-stranded genomes of 2.1–2.2 kilobases in length. All but one genomovirids contain monopartite genomes, whereas the genome of Fusarium graminearum gemytripvirus 1 (genus Gemytripvirus) consists of three segments. The monopartite genomes encode two proteins—a Rep (replicator) and a  CP (capsid) protein. The Rep protein is most closely similar to the Rep protein of the Geminiviridae. In contrast, the CP protein has no known homologues.

References

DNA viruses
Virus families